Phi Tau Sigma is the Honor Society for food science and technology. It was incorporated under the General Laws of the Commonwealth of Massachusetts , as "Phi Tau Sigma Honorary Society, Inc."

Greek letters designation
Some have speculated or assumed that the Greek letters correspond to the initials of "Food Technology Society". However very recent research by Mary K. Schmidl, making use of documents retrieved from the Oregon State University archives by Robert McGorrin, including the 1958 Constitution, has elucidated the real basis of the choice. The 1958 Constitution is headed with three Greek words 
"ΦΙΛΕΙΝ ΤΡΟΦΗΣ ΣΠΟΥΔΗΝ"  under which are the English words "Devotion to the Study of Foods". With the assistance of Petros Taoukis, the Greek words are translated as follows:

ΦΙΛΕΙΝ: Love or devotion (pronounced Philleen, accent on the last syllable)

ΤΡΟΦΗΣ:of Food (pronounced Trophees, accent on the last syllable)

ΣΠΟΥΔΗΝ: Study  (pronounced Spootheen, accent on the last syllable - th as in the word “the” or “this” not like in the word “thesis”).

 represent the initials of those three Greek words.

Charter Members
Besides Livingston, the charter members of the Honor Society were M.P. Baldorf, Robert V. Decareau, E. Felicotti, W.D. Powrie, M.A. Steinberg, and D.E. Westcott.

Purposes
 To recognize and honor professional achievements of Food Scientists and Technologists,
 To encourage the application of fundamental scientific principles to Food Science and Technology in each of its branches,
 To stimulate the exchange of scientific knowledge through meetings, lectures, and publications,
 To establish and maintain a network of like-minded professionals, and
 To promote exclusively charitable, scientific, literary and educational programs.

Members

Phi Tau Sigma has (currently) 1185 members, who are kept up-to-date on Society matters through a monthly Newsletter from the Executive Secretary.

Members are elected as students or after graduation in recognition of their achievements and to facilitate their active participation in Phi Tau Sigma and the profession of Food Science and Technology.

ELIGIBILITY GUIDELINES

A.	Eligibility for Associate Members

1.	Undergraduate students being nominated for Associate Membership should be pursuing a degree program in Food Science or equivalent.  The nomination statement for students pursuing programs of study other than those meeting IFT Education Standards should provide evidence of the program's content in Food Chemistry and Analysis, Food Safety and Microbiology and Food Processing and Engineering.

2.	Graduate students being nominated for Associate Membership should be
pursuing a graduate degree in Food Science or equivalent.  The nomination statement for students pursuing graduate degrees other than Food Science should clearly illustrate the relationship of the student's background or program of study to Food Science.

3.	Undergraduate and graduate students being nominated for Associate Membership should have a Grade Point Average (GPA) equal to or greater than 3.5, or equivalent.  The nomination statement for students with a GPA less than 3.5 should provide evidence of academic achievements to justify the nomination.

4.	The nomination statement for undergraduate and graduate students should focus on recognitions, honors and other academic achievements of the student being nominated.

5.       As from 1 January 2016, the annual subscription for Associate Membership is $20.

   
B.	Eligibility for Members:

1.	Food Science and Technology professionals being nominated for Membership should have a minimum of 5 years of experience beyond B.S. degree (4 years beyond M.S. degree or 2 years beyond a PhD degree) in a position directly related to food science and technology in industry, government or an academic institution.

2.	The nomination of Food Science and Technology professionals should clearly illustrate how contributions of the nominee’s professional position have distinguished the nominee from other professionals with similar professional experiences.

3.	The nomination statement for the Food Science and Technology professional should demonstrate how the recognitions, honors and other achievements of the nominee justify the nomination.

4.      As from 1 January 2016 the annual subscription for Membership is $40.

Application forms can be accessed on the Phi Tau Sigma Website http://phitausigma.org/downloads.php

Chapters
As of 2014, there are 41 Chapters (primarily at educational institutions, including the following) in the U.S., Mexico and China. These are formed to better serve the members at the local level. In chronological order of being chartered:

University of Massachusetts Amherst
Massachusetts Institute of Technology
Rutgers University
University of Georgia
University of Wisconsin–Madison
Cornell University - Chapter website
Michigan State University
University of California, Davis
Virginia Polytechnic Institute and State University
Ohio State University
Purdue University
Pennsylvania State University
Columbia University
Texas A&M University
Mississippi State University
Louisiana State University
Mexico 
New York University
Iowa State University
University of Nebraska-Lincoln
University of Rhode Island
University of Arkansas
University of Tennessee
University of Minnesota
North Carolina State University
Kansas State University
Alabama A&M University
University of Missouri
University of Maine
California Polytechnic State University
University of Idaho
University of Illinois at Urbana-Champaign
University of Florida
University of Puerto Rico
 Texas Woman's University
 California State University, Fresno
Chapman University
 Shanghai Ocean University
 Wayne State University
 Clemson University
 Institute for Food Safety and Health

Relationship with the Institute of Food Technologists
Phi Tau Sigma is a body with its own elected Officers and separate from the scientific professional organization, the Institute of Food Technologists (IFT). Over the years its relationship with IFT has varied; but currently it has a mutual and respectful partnership with IFT in the following areas:

•		Since the 1984 IFT Annual Meeting, each year it presents the Dr. Carl R. Fellers Award for “service to the field of food science and technology; and for bringing honor and recognition to the profession of food science and technology through a distinguished career displaying exemplary leadership, service, and communication skills that enhance the effectiveness of all food scientists in serving society”. The Award is named for Dr. Carl R. Fellers, a food science professor who chaired the food technology department at the University of Massachusetts where the first Phi Tau Sigma Chapter was founded in 1953.

The deadline for applications for the 2015 Award was January 15, 2015. 
To apply for the Award go to  http://www.ift.org/Membership/Awards-and-Recognition/Achievement-Awards/Carl-R-Fellers-Award.aspx

The list of Carl R. Fellers Award winners is:

 1984 Emil M. Mrak
 1985 Bernard S.Schweigert
 1986 Edwin M. Foster
 1987 Roy E. Morse
 1988 Owen R. Fennema
 1989 Frederick J. Francis
 1990 Richard L. Hall
 1991 David R. Lineback
 1992 Gilbert A. Leveille
 1993 Gideon E. Livingston
 1994 John H. Litchfield
 1995 Fergus M. Clydesdale
 1996 Susan K. Harlander
 1997 Paul F. Hopper
 1998 Roy G. Arnold
 1999 Manfred Kroger
 2000 Dane T. Bernard
 2001 Myron "Mike" Solberg 
 2002 J. Ralph Blanchfield	
 2003 Daryl B. Lund 
 2004 Barbara O. Schneeman
 2005 Philip E. Nelson
 2006 Daniel Y.C. Fung
 2007 Ken Lee
 2008 Robert B. Gravani
 2009 Kathryn L. Kotula
 2010 Anthony Kotula
 2011 Christine Bruhn
 2012 Mary K. Schmidl
 2013 Dennis R. Heldman
 2014 H. Russell Cross
 2015 David Patrick Green
 2016 Gary List
 2017 S. Suzanne Nielsen
 2018 Charles H. Manley
 2019 Colin Dennis
 2020 Carl Winter

•		In 1977 the first ΦΤΣ Graduate Paper Competition was initiated at the Annual Meeting of IFT.  The competition included both written and oral presentations. At that time, the competition was open to any student who attended the IFT Annual Meeting.  Six winners were selected across the United States. Today (in July 2013), the Student Competition is still sponsored by Phi Tau Sigma but there were approximately 150 winning students recognized for their excellence in research in different specific disciplines of food science and technology (IFT Divisions) or by their written skills or oral presentation skills at the graduate and undergraduate levels. During the IFT Annual Meeting a Phi Tau Sigma event is organized at which the winners are recognized. In addition recognition is made of the winner of the Dr. Carl R. Fellers Award, the Phi Tau Sigma Special Recognition Award, the Phi Tau Sigma Student Achievement Award, the Dr. Daryl B. Lund International Scholarship, the Dr. Gideon “Guy” Livingston Scholarship, and the Phi Tau Sigma Founders’ Award. Additionally, the new Phi Tau Sigma officers are announced. Any new Chapters of Phi Tau Sigma that have been formed in the past year are recognized and presented with their Charter.

•		In 2012 a new tradition began thanks to Dr. Robert Shewfelt and Dr. S. Suzanne Nielsen.  These two Lifetime Members of Phi Tau Sigma worked with the Education Division of IFT to cosponsor symposia and provide recognition to the Achievement Award Recipients.

•		In 2013, Phi Tau Sigma, for the first time, garnered the support and cooperation from the Council of Food Science Administrators.  This powerful and influential group represents the Departments and Colleges of Food Science and/or Technology across the United States.  Phi Tau Sigma was fortunate to cosponsor a number of sessions/workshops on professional/soft skill development this year
A link to information about Phi Tau Sigma is on the IFT Website at http://www.ift.org/community/groups.aspx

Leadership
Its current President (2020-2021) is Rodrigo Tarté.
It has an Executive Committee made up of President, President Elect, Past President, Treasurer, Executive Secretary, six At-Large Councilors (Directors) and 6 Alternate At-Large Councilors.
  
It also has a Leadership Council (formerly known as Advisory Council) consisting of representatives of Chapters.

The following are the Phi Tau Sigma Presidents since its formation:

 Year     President

•	1953-55 		Gideon E. Livingston

•	1955-56 		William B. Esselen

•	1956-57 		Carl S. Pederson

•	1957-58 		Emil M. Mrak

•	1958-59 		Samuel A. Goldblith

•	1959-60 		Fred C. Baselt

•	1960-61 		Zoltan I. Kertesz

•	1961-62 		Charles Olin Ball

•	1962-63 		John C. Ayres

•	1963-65 		R. Ernest Buck

•	1965-67 		Roy E. Morse

•	1967-68 		Paul A. Buck

•	1968-69 		John J. Powers

•	1969-71 		Georg A. Borgstrom

•	1971-73 		William J. Stadelman

•	1973-74 		Anthony Lopez

•	1974-75 		Herbert A. Hollender

•	1975-76 		Edward E. Burns

•	1976-77 		William J. Hoover

•	1977-78 		Philip E. Nelson

•	1978-79 		Richard G. Garner

•	1979-80 		Frederick J. Francis

•	1980-81 		Elwood F. Caldwell

•	1981-82 		Dee M. Graham

•	1982-83 		Richard V. Lechowich

•	1983-84 		Gale R. Ammerman

•	1984-85 		Charles F. Niven Jr.

•	1985-86 		David R. Lineback

•	1986-87 		Robert M. Schaffner

•	1987-88 		Lowell A. Satterlee

•	1988-89 		Fred R. Tarver

•	1989-90 		Bruce A. Lister

•	1990-91 		Walter R. Clark

•	1991-92 		Ronald A. Richter

•	1992-93 		Fergus M. Clydesdale

•	1993-94 		Arnold E. Denton

•	1994-95 		C. Ann Hollingsworth

•	1995-96 		Manfred Kroger

•	1996-97 		Philip B. Crandall

•	1997-99 		Daniel Y. C. Fung

•	1999-00 		Robert D. Noyes

•	2000-01 		Mary Ellen Camire

•	2001-02 		Duane K. Larick

•	2002-03 		Mary K. Wagner

•	2003-04 		Louise Wicker

•	2004-05 		Mario de Figueiredo

•	2005-06 		Roger A. Clemens

•	2006-08 		Daryl B. Lund

•	2008-10 		Yao-Wen Huang

•	2010-11 		Dennis R. Heldman

•	2011-12 		Ken Lee

•	2012-13 		S. Suzanne Nielsen

•	2013-14 		Mary K. Schmidl

•	2014-15 		William Benjy Mikel

•	2015-16  Janet E. Collins

•	2016-17 		H. Russell Cross

•	2017-18  Robert E. Brackett

•	2018-19 		Rakesh K. Singh

•	2019-20 		Elizabeth A. E. Boyle

•	2020-21 		Martin F. Sancho-Madriz

•	2021-   		Rodrigo Tarté

Awards and Scholarships
All Phi Tau Sigma Awards, except the Dr. Carl R. Fellers Award, are presented at the Phi Tau Sigma Special Recognition Event, which is usually scheduled for the first day of the IFT Annual Meeting. Nominations are encouraged.

Dr. Carl R. Fellers Award

Phi Tau Sigma sponsors the Dr. Carl R. Fellers Award to honor a member of the Institute of Food Technologists (IFT) and Phi Tau Sigma who has brought honor and recognition to the profession of Food Science and Technology through a distinguished career in the profession displaying exemplary leadership, service and communication skills that enhance the effectiveness of all Food Scientists in serving society. The award consists of an honorarium of $3,000 furnished by Phi Tau Sigma and a plaque furnished by IFT that is presented at the Awards event.

Phi Tau Sigma Special Recognition Award

The Phi Tau Sigma Special Recognition Award is given to a Member of Phi Tau Sigma who has shown exceptional dedication to Phi Tau Sigma - The Honor Society of Food Science and Technology, as evidenced by significant accomplishments towards the goals and/or administration of Phi Tau Sigma. The award consists of a plaque and an appropriate memento provided by Phi Tau Sigma.

Phi Tau Sigma Student Achievement Scholarship

The Phi Tau Sigma Student Achievement Scholarship is given to an Associate Member of Phi Tau Sigma who has shown exceptional scholastic achievement and a dedication to Phi Tau Sigma. Up to 3 awards may be made in a year. The scholarship consists of a plaque and $1,000 provided by Phi Tau Sigma.

Dr. Daryl B. Lund International Scholarship

The Dr. Daryl B. Lund International Scholarship of Phi Tau Sigma, The Honor Society of Food Science and Technology, is given to an Associate Member of Phi Tau Sigma to supplement international travel for educational purposes. The award is presented to honor the commitment of Dr. Lund to international development and relations. The award consists of a plaque and a $2,000 scholarship provided by Phi Tau Sigma.

Phi Tau Sigma Outstanding Chapter of the Year Award

The Phi Tau Sigma Outstanding Chapter of the Year Award is given to honor a Chapter of Phi Tau Sigma that has achieved excellence in the areas of research, scholarship, leadership and service.
The award comes with a plaque and $1000 to be used by the Chapter to advance distinction in the food science discipline.

Dr. Gideon “Guy” E. Livingston Scholarship

The Dr. Gideon “Guy” Livingston Scholarship of Phi Tau Sigma shall be given to an Associate Member of Phi Tau Sigma in honor of the founder of Phi Tau Sigma, and to acknowledge that student’s scholastic achievements, and dedication to Phi Tau Sigma. The award consists of a plaque and a $1000 scholarship, provided by Phi Tau Sigma. The scholarship is based on the year’s return from the Dr. Gideon “Guy” E. Livingston Endowment.

Phi Tau Sigma Founders’ Scholarship

The Phi Tau Sigma Founders’ Scholarship is given to an Associate Member or Member of Phi Tau Sigma – The Honor Society of Food Science and Technology, whose graduate research has had, or is expected to have, a significant impact - a practical and meaningful application. The objective of this scholarship is to emphasize the importance of original research, carefully selected, to solve vexing problems of the food industry. The scholarship includes a plaque and $1,000 provided by Phi Tau Sigma.

References

 Phi Tau Sigma Website:  http://www.phitausigma.org/
 Francis, F.J. (1993). Seventy-Five Years of Food Science (1918-1993) at the University of Massachusetts. Amherst, MA: University of Massachusetts Amherst Department of Food Science.
 Schmidl, M.K. (2013). Food Technology, on-line article on Phi Tau Sigma
http://www.ift.org/food-technology/past-issues/2013/november/features/phi-tau-sigma-honor-society.aspx

1953 establishments in Massachusetts
Honor societies
University of Massachusetts Amherst
Student organizations established in 1953